AT&T Field is a baseball field located in Chattanooga, Tennessee. It is the home of the minor league Chattanooga Lookouts of the Southern League. The capacity of the stadium is 6,382 people, with the vast majority of seating located on the first base side. Construction of the stadium began in March 1999, and was completed for the 2000 season. The stadium's first game was on April 10, 2000, a 5–4 Chattanooga win.

AT&T Field was known as BellSouth Park until March 2007, when the ballpark's name was changed to reflect the purchase of BellSouth by AT&T Inc.

Field diagram

References

External links
 Chattanooga Lookouts

Sports venues in Chattanooga, Tennessee
Minor league baseball venues
Baseball venues in Tennessee
Southern League (1964–present) ballparks